Kerala University of Digital Sciences, Innovation and Technology, also known as Digital University Kerala (DUK), is a state university located in Technocity, Mangalapuram, Pallippuram, Thiruvananthapuram, Kerala, India. It was established in 2020 by upgrading Indian Institute of Information Technology and Management, Kerala (IIITM-K), established 2000. It is the 14th State University in Kerala and first Digital University in the state.

History
The Indian Institute of Information Technology and Management, Kerala (IIITM-K) was established in 2000. It originally operated from a campus in Technopark in Thiruvananthapuram until the construction of the campus at Technocity and was affiliated to Cochin University of Science and Technology. In 2020 IIITM-K was upgraded to a university through an  Ordinance of the Government of Kerala.

Campus 

The residential campus is located in campus of Technocity in Thiruvananthapuram.

Leadership
The Governor of Kerala is, by virtue of office, the Chancellor of the university and the Minister in Charge of Information Technology Department is the Pro-Chancellor of the university. The Government of Kerala had appointed Saji Gopinath as the first Vice-chancellor of the university.

Major schools 

 School of Computer Science and Engineering
 School of Electronic Systems and Automation
 School of Digital Sciences
 School of Informatics
 School of Digital Humanities and Liberal Arts

Kerala Blockchain Academy
The institute also houses Kerala Blockchain Academy, second in the country. Kerala Blockchain Academy is also an associate member of the Hyperledger community.

References

External links
 

Science and technology in Kerala
Research institutes in Thiruvananthapuram
Universities in Thiruvananthapuram
2020 establishments in Kerala